Honda Racing can refer to one of the following:

Honda Racing Corporation, Honda's motorcycle racing subsidiary
Honda Racing F1, the Formula One four-wheel racing team
Honda in motorsport, overview of Honda's motorsport activities
Honda Performance Development, Honda's American motorsport subsidiary